There are several video games based on Buichi Terasawa's manga series Cobra. The games have been released on home and handheld consoles, as well as on personal computers, mobile phones and pachinko. The first games to be released from the Cobra series were Space Cobra Professional and The Psychogun, which were published in 1982, and the latest release is Cobra the Drum, which was released in 2014. Amidst the several games released—most of them are Japan-exclusive products—Cobra and Cobra II were developed by French company Loriciels while The Space Adventure is the only Japanese game published in North America and Europe.

Video games

Notes
Japanese

References

video games
Cobra
Cobra